The 1941 Oklahoma City vs. Youngstown football game was a college football game between the Oklahoma City University Goldbugs and the Youngstown College Penguins (now called Youngstown State University) played on October 16, 1941.  The game was played in Rayen Stadium in Youngstown, Ohio.  The game marks the first use of the penalty flag in American football.

Youngstown was highly favored against Oklahoma City in the press, based on their undefeated record up to that point.

Youngstown defeated Oklahoma City by a score of 48 to 7.

Game play

First quarter
Youngstown scored twice in the first quarter, both on connections between quarterback Jim Heber to end Pete Lanzi.  The first, a 23-yard pass was the result of a fumble by Oklahoma City's fullback Bill Harris on their first possession within the first minute.  The second was a 55-yard pass for a touchdown.

Second quarter
Neither team scored in the game's second quarter.

Third quarter
Youngstown scored two more touchdowns in the third quarter.  First when Jim Heber threw an 18-yard pass once again to Pete Lanzi.  Later in the period, substitutes Alfred Bucci caught a 21-yard pass from Glenn Dickson.  The next score saw Oklahoma City complete a three-yard run for a touchdown.

Fourth quarter
Youngstown scored three more touchdowns in the fourth quarter as Glenn Dickson made it to the end zone again, this time on a 39-yard run.  Youngstown defender Edward Lindsey made good with a 50-yard interception to score, and Youngstown's Cestary completed a four-yard carry.  With extra points, Youngstown earned 21 points in the final quarter.  Both teams managed to earn nine first downs from scrimmage.  The final score was Youngstown 48, Oklahoma City 7.

Aftermath
Game official Jack McPhee said, "Through the use of the signal flag, everyone in the stadium knows that something is wrong. It's been a big help."   Officials generally agreed that the game play was better with the use of the penalty flag instead of the previous methods of blowing a whistle to mark a penalty.  McPhee went on to use the penalty flag in other games including the Rose Bowl.

It would be the only matchup between the two schools, as Oklahoma City later de-emphasized athletics and dropped to the National Association of Intercollegiate Athletics in 1985; current NCAA rules only allow Division III schools to play NAIA-member schools, while Youngstown State is Division I FCS and is therefore only allowed to play Division I FBS and a limited number of Division II schools in addition to other D-I FCS schools. Oklahoma City University (now known as the "Stars") have also have not fielded a football program since the Second World War. The two areas do have a current connection between them: former Oklahoma Sooners head coach Bob Stoops is a Youngstown native.

The American Football Coaches Association officially introduced the penalty flag at the 1948 rules session.  The penalty flag is now standard officiating equipment and is used in every competitive football game throughout the world.

In 1969, the original penalty flag was turned over to the College Football Hall of Fame.

References

1941 college football season
vs. Youngstown 1941
vs. Oklahoma City 1941
October 1941 sports events
1941 in sports in Ohio